John Lofland may refer to:

 John Lofland (poet) (1798–1849), American poet and writer, known as the Milford Bard
 John Lofland (sociologist) (born 1936), American sociologist, professor, and author